A 1999 bronze sculpture of French Canadian social worker and Roman Catholic religious sister Émilie Gamelin by Raoul Hunter is installed in the Saint Catherine Street exit of Montreal's Berri-UQAM station, in Quebec, Canada.

References

External links
 

1999 establishments in Canada
1999 sculptures
Cultural depictions of activists
Cultural depictions of Canadian women
Cultural depictions of religious leaders
Monuments and memorials in Montreal
Sculptures of women in Canada
Statues of activists
Statues in Canada
Statues of religious leaders